WKAM 1460 AM is a radio station broadcasting a Regional Mexican music format. Licensed to Goshen, Indiana, the station is owned by I.B. Communications, LTD. The station also broadcasts on translator 98.1 W251AR licensed to Goshen, Indiana.

History
WKAM was established in Warsaw, Indiana, with the awarding of a construction permit to Kosciusko Broadcasting Corporation for a 250-watt, daytime-only radio station on December 22, 1948. The station went on the air in July 1949 and remained in Warsaw until 1954, when it was approved to move to Goshen, change frequency to 1460 kHz, and increase power to 500 watts.

98.1 FM translator

References

External links
La Raza 98.1's official website

KAM
KAM